Panvel railway station (station code: PL /PNVL ) is a railway station on the Harbour Line and Central line of the Mumbai Suburban Railway network.

The station inter-connects to the proposed Navi Mumbai International Airport integrating along with Palm Beach Marg. Panvel station was originally opened as a rail freight transport in 1962, for limited service to Diva railway station.

Inbound and outbound trains shares a twelve-car platform on the inbound track, requiring Panvel passengers to embark or debark from the forthcoming coaches of outbound trains or the rear coaches of inbound trains. The route has been set up for cargo services travelling from Karjat} to Navi Mumbai. An in-development terminus of the station had been proposed in 2007.

The Navi Mumbai Municipal Transport buses from the station run in both Old and New Panvel. it is expected to increase ridership at Old Panvel from 94% total daily boardings and alightings. After the success of the bus services, NMMT proposed to expand the bus services from the station.

It handles 2 Rajdhani Express

12431/12432 Thiruvananthapuram Rajdhani Express
22413/22414 Madgaon Rajdhani Express

History

Inauguration
The station was introduced as the Panvel–Diva railway line, serving as rail freight transport in 1962 and was used for cargo services. The Indian Railways ministry had commissioned the independent commuter railway services in 1964. In addition, a number of development activities have been conducted, including track expansions, electrification of the coaches and addition of long-route express trains.

Proposed terminus development

In 2007, the Central Railways ministries had proposed to develop a terminus, serving the inbound and outbound long distance express trains. City and Industrial Development Corporation (CIDCO) stated that the corporation also has a two-thirds of expenditure on the project and the CR has the major expenditure plan. The CR ministries also stated that the development of the terminus will be completed in 2018. The terminus also consists two separate platforms for the express trains.

Services and further development

CIDCO corridor project
CIDCO has implemented a six-corridor railway project including the Mankhurd–Belapur–Panvel Railway Line and Panvel/Belapur–Uran Railway Line.

The Mankhurd–Belapur–Panvel Railway Corridor Line was first commissioned on 25 January 1995 as a single line connecting to Khandeshwar station from Belapur station. The line was subsequently expanded to Panvel on 29 June 1998. On 14 April 2000, the line got subsequently expanded as double line services from Chhatrapati Shivaji Terminus to Panvel.

The Panvel/Belapur–Uran Corridor Line was originally planned in 1996, but later it was halted due to unknown reasons in 2008.

Implementation of shuttle train services
In 2006, the Central Railways ministries had proposed the shuttle train services between Karjat station and Panvel. The plan was implemented as the cargo service trains uses the single track of the Panvel–Karjat route.
In October 2015, the shuttle train services were started between Diva station and Panvel on the trial basis. Due to the establishment of shuttle train services, the commuters from the New Panvel can travel directly to Diva. A new shuttle train service is going to be commissioned between Panvel and Bhiwandi / Vasai / Virar stations which is a 70 km project. Currently, there are 13 stations on this route. 11 more stations are to be built after the project commences.

Track elevation

In 2012, CIDCO had proposed a  metro corridor of Navi Mumbai Metro, linking from Belapur to the proposed Navi Mumbai International Airport.

However, in January 2016, the CST-Panvel elevated corridor project was proposed by Mumbai Railway Vikas Corporation (MVRC) to connect the route along Palm Beach Marg to the proposed international airport. The report was revised in February 2016 of the project and was stated that the corridor will be integrated with the Navi Mumbai Metro, connecting the Chhatrapati Shivaji International Airport to the proposed airport.

Bus connections
The station serves as the major hub from the Navi Mumbai Municipal Transport (NMMT) bus routes serving the Navi Mumbai areas. In August 2015, NMMT and Panvel City Municipal Corporation (PCMC) had implemented to start the bus services serving the three major parts of the city from the station, including Sai Nagar, Uran Naka and Palaspa Phata.

Gallery

References

External links 
 Panvel railway station at Wikimapia

Railway stations in Raigad district
Panvel-Roha rail line
Karjat-Panvel rail line
Diva-Panvel rail line
Mumbai Suburban Railway stations
Mumbai CR railway division
Railway stations opened in 1962
1962 establishments in Maharashtra
Transport in Panvel